Fábio Rúben Soares Jaló (born 18 November 2005) is a Portuguese professional footballer who plays as a forward for  club Barnsley.

Career
Jaló began playing football in his native Portugal with Benfica, before moving to England with Barnsley in 2019. He signed his first professional contract with Barnsley at the age of 16 in July 2022, having been named as 2021–22 Academy Player of the Season after scoring 27 goals in all competitions. He made his senior debut on 10 August, in a 1–0 victory at Middlesbrough in the EFL Cup, becoming the sixth youngest player in the club's history. On 11 October 2022, Jalo scored his first professional goals, scoring twice in a 4–2 away victory over Doncaster Rovers in the EFL Trophy.

International career
Jaló was first called up to the Portugal U-18 team for a training camp, on 18 January 2023

Career statistics

References

External links

2005 births
Living people
Footballers from Lisbon
Portuguese footballers
Portuguese people of Bissau-Guinean descent
Association football forwards
Barnsley F.C. players
English Football League players
Portuguese expatriate footballers
Portuguese expatriates in England
Expatriate footballers in England